SYSTAT is a statistics and statistical graphics software package, developed by Leland Wilkinson in the late 1970s, who was at the time an assistant professor of psychology at the University of Illinois at Chicago. Systat Software Inc. was incorporated in 1983 and grew to over 50 employees.

In 1995, SYSTAT was sold to SPSS Inc., who marketed the product to a scientific audience under the SPSS Science division. By 2002, SPSS had changed its focus to business analytics and decided to sell SYSTAT to Cranes Software in Bangalore, India. Cranes formed Systat Software, Inc. to market and distribute SYSTAT in the US, and a number of other divisions for global distribution. The headquarters are in Chicago, Illinois.

By 2005, SYSTAT was in its eleventh version having a revamped codebase completely changed from Fortran into C++. Version 13 came out in 2009, with improvements in the user interface and several new features.

See also
Comparison of statistical packages
PeakFit
TableCurve 2D
TableCurve 3D

References

External links
SYSTAT
The story of SYSTAT as told by Wilkinson

C++ software
Statistical software
Windows-only software